Mareno is a given name. Notable people with the name include:

Mareno Philyaw (born 1977), American football player
Mareno Michels (born 1984), Dutch darts player

See also
Mareno di Piave, commune in the Province of Treviso
Moreno (given name)